Ambujam Krishna (1917 - 1989) was a composer of Carnatic Kritis. She has composed more than 600 kritis in various Carnatic ragas.

Personal life 
Ambujam Krishna is the daughter of K. V. Ranga Iyengar, an advocate of Madurai. She had her music training under Karaikudi Ganesan and Ganesha Bhagavathar. She married T. S. Krishna who was an industrialist and son of T. V. Sundaram Iyengar. She graduated in Home Science from the Delhi University. Industrialist Suresh Krishna is her son.

Musical journey 
Ambujam Krishna has composed kritis in various languages such as Sanskrit, Kannada, Tamil and Telugu. She has also composed songs with more than one language in the same song. It is called Manipravalam in Tamil. Her compositions have been published in two volumes under the title Geetamala.
Her compositions have been tuned by various music masters like T. N. Seshagopalan, V. V. Sadagopan, S. Ramanathan, Semmangudi Srinivasa Iyer and others. 
She was a senior office bearer of Sri Sathguru Sangeetha Samajam, Madurai. She started a music college Satguru Sangeetha Vidyalayam as a wing of the sabha.

References

External links 
List of some compositions
Songs of Ambujam Krishna
 - A composition of Ambujam Krishna (her favourite) sung by M. S. Subbulakshmi

1917 births
1989 deaths
Carnatic composers
Women Carnatic singers
Carnatic singers
Musicians from Madurai